Alison Herst (born March 7, 1971) is a Canadian sprint kayaker who competed in the early to mid-1990s. She won two medals in the K-4 200 m event at the ICF Canoe Sprint World Championships with a gold in 1995 and a bronze in 1994. Herst was born in Toronto, Ontario.

Herst also competed in two Summer Olympics, earning her best finish of fifth on two occasions (1992: K-2 500 m, 1996: K-4 500 m).

References

1971 births
Canoeists from Toronto
Canadian female canoeists
Canoeists at the 1992 Summer Olympics
Canoeists at the 1996 Summer Olympics
Living people
Olympic canoeists of Canada
ICF Canoe Sprint World Championships medalists in kayak